The Sea may refer to:

The sea, a body of salty water.

Arts, entertainment, and me dia

Films
La Mer (film) (The Sea), an 1895 French short, black-and-white, silent documentary film directed by Louis Lumière
The Sea (1933 film) (original Polish title: Morze), a 1933 Polish short, documentary film directed by Wanda Jakubowska
The Sea (1962 film) (original Italian title: Il mare), a 1962 drama Italian film directed by Giuseppe Patroni Griffi
The Sea (2000 film) (original Spanish title: El mar), a 2000 Spanish drama film directed by Agustí Villaronga
The Sea (2002 film) (original Icelandic title: Hafið), a 2002 Icelandic comedy-drama film directed by Baltasar Kormákur
The Sea (2013 film) , a 2013 British drama film directed by Stephen Brown

Literature
The Sea (novel), a 2005 Booker Prize-winning novel by John Banville
The Sea (play), a 1973 play by Edward Bond
The Sea or The Proverb of the Sea, a poem by the philosopher and poet Khalil Gibran

Music

Groups
The Sea (band), a rock pop band formed in Cornwall, England

Albums
The Sea (Ketil Bjørnstad album), 1995
The Sea II, a 1998 album (recorded 1996) by Norwegian pianist Ketil Bjørnstad 
The Sea (Melanie C album), 2011
The Sea (Corinne Bailey Rae album), 2010
The Sea, a 1967 album by Rod McKuen

Songs
"Beyond the Sea" (song), a song based on "La Mer"
"The Sea", a song by Sandy Denny, which appeared on Fotheringay's eponymous first album as well as the Island Records sampler album, Bumpers
"The Sea", a song by Morcheeba from their 1998 album Big Calm
"The Sea", a song by Corinne Bailey Rae from her second album.
"The Sea", a song by Sigismund von Neukomm

Symphonic music
A Sea Symphony, a piece by Ralph Vaughan Williams
The Sea (Bridge), an orchestral suite by Frank Bridge
The Sea, a symphonic poem by Mikalojus Konstantinas Čiurlionis

Other uses
Sea (astronomy), an area of the sky with many water-related and few land-related constellations
The Sea, an unconsidered competitor who finished sixth in the 1840 Grand National

See also
La mer (disambiguation)
Sea (disambiguation)
The Sea, the Sea, a novel by Iris Murdoch